Syria competed at the 2013 World Championships in Athletics from 10–18 August in Moscow, Russia.
One athlete was
announced to represent the country
in the competition.

Results

Men

External links
Official IAAF competition website

Nations at the 2013 World Championships in Athletics
World Championships in Athletics
Syria at the World Championships in Athletics